Utetheisa flavothoracica is a moth in the family Erebidae. It was described by Rob de Vos in 2007. It is found in the Philippines.

Subspecies
Utetheisa flavothoracica flavothoracica
Utetheisa flavothoracica camarinensis de Vos, 2007 (Philippines: southern Luzon)

References

Moths described in 2007
flavothoracica